Miroslaw Szonert (25 December 1926, Łowicz, Poland – 31 October 1995, Łódź) was a Polish film and television actor. A graduate of the National Film School in Łódź, Szonert was an actor at the Powszechny Theatre in Łódź.

References

External links
http://www.imdb.com/name/nm0844231/

1926 births
1995 deaths
People from Łowicz
Polish male actors